Oriana Sachenka Martínez Pedrón (born 2 December 1989) is a Venezuelan footballer who plays as a centre back for Spanish Segunda División Pro club Alhama CF and the Venezuela women's national team.

International career
Martínez played for Venezuela at senior level in the 2010 Central American and Caribbean Games. She was also called up to play the 2010 South American Women's Football Championship.

References

1989 births
Living people
Women's association football central defenders
Venezuelan women's footballers
Venezuela women's international footballers
Footballers from Caracas
Deportivo La Guaira players
EdF Logroño players
Venezuelan expatriate women's footballers
Venezuelan expatriate sportspeople in Spain
Expatriate women's footballers in Spain